The Latin word frondosa (meaning "leafy") is the species name of many unrelated fungi, plants, and animals that have a frondose shape.

Fungi
Grifola frondosa, a polypore mushroom that grows at the base of oaks, called hen of the woods.
Tremella frondosa, a jelly fungus known in China

Plants
Primula frondosa, a species of flowering plant in the family Primulaceae, native to the Balkans
Calceolaria frondosa, a flowering plant endemic to Ecuador
Gaylussacia frondosa, a flowering plant in the heath family
Bidens frondosa, a North American annual herb related to sunflowers
Mussaenda frondosa, a shrub in the family Rubiaceae, also called the dhobi tree.
Nematolepis frondosa, a shrub endemic to Victoria, Australia
Muhlenbergia frondosa, a satin grass in genus Muhlenbergia.

Animals
Bougainvillia frondosa, a hydrozoan invertebrate
Rhinopias frondosa, a benthic marine fish in the Scorpionfish family
Tritonia frondosa, a dendronotid nudibranch (sea slug).
Cucumaria frondosa, the orange-footed sea cucumber.
Heterotrypa frondosa, an Ordovician fossil organism among the Paleozoic life of Tennessee

See also
Frondose
Frond